Chris Evert took her third US Clay Court title in succession and $6,000 first-prize money, defeating Gail Chanfreau in the final for the loss of only 15 points.

Seeds
A champion seed is indicated in bold text while text in italics indicates the round in which that seed was eliminated.

Draw

Finals

Top half

Section 1

Section 2

Bottom half

Section 3

Section 4

References

U.S. Clay Court Championships
1974 U.S. Clay Court Championships